The scrub euphonia (Euphonia affinis) is a species of bird in the family Fringillidae.

Taxonomy
Euphonia affinis is divided into several subspecies.  The species E. godmani of the Pacific coast of central Mexico is now considered to be a full species, West Mexican euphonia (Euphonia godmani).

Description 

Both sexes have a thin, fine bill, smaller than that of other euphonias. Legs and eyes are dark. The male is bright yellow below and black above, with a small yellow spot on the forecrown. The crissum is white.  Females have a grey head, dusky olive upperparts, buff-grey underparts, and white belly and crissum.

Breeding 
Its nest is a globular structure with a side entrance, placed in tangles of vegetation or another protected place.  The eggs number 2-5 and are whitish with brown speckles.

Distribution and habitat 
The scrub euphonia ranges on both coasts of Mexico, south from the states Sonora and Nuevo Leon, as well as much of the country east of the Isthmus of Tehuantepec, including the Yucatan Peninsula.  It is found throughout Belize, Guatemala, Honduras and Nicaragua and along the Atlantic and Central and Northern Pacific coastal lowlands in Costa Rica. It can be found in areas of secondary growth, stands of trees, agricultural areas and gardens and other human-disturbed areas.

Behaviour 
The scrub euphonia is frequently found in association with yellow-throated euphonias, as well as in mixed species feeding flocks.  It consumes much fruit, being particularly attracted by mistletoe berries.

Vocalizations 
This is a vocal species.  Its calls include a bright , a plaintive syeeu syeeu and a twittering flight call, slip slip.  Their songs are variable, including si chi-chi-chi-si and a liquid, twittering warble.

Threats 
This bird is widespread and evaluated as least concern by the IUCN.  It can adapt to human-altered environments and is a common bird throughout its large range.

References

scrub euphonia
Birds of Central America
Birds of the Yucatán Peninsula
scrub euphonia
Taxonomy articles created by Polbot